Apach is a commune in the Moselle department in Grand Est in northeastern France.

It is on the border of Germany and Luxembourg, the municipalities just across the border being Perl in Germany and Schengen in Luxembourg.

A natural reserve for orchids is located along the limestone hillsides, of which there are many in this town.

Population

See also 
 Communes of the Moselle department

References

External links
 

Communes of Moselle (department)